Noor Bibi is a 2018-2019 Pakistani drama television series first aired on Geo Entertainment , produced by Barkat Sidiki under his production banner Promax Media and directed by Irshad Ali. It features Usman Peerzada, Resham, Sanam Chaudhry, Ali Abbas, Saniya Shamshad and Gohar Rasheed in pivotal roles.

In 2021, serial aired on sister channel Geo Kahani under the same title.

Cast
 Resham as Noor Bibi; a witchcraft artist, famous for her spiritual powers and has an influential family background, who manipulates situations and circumstances and appear as healer or preacher to people.
Usman Peerzada as Raja Shaukat Ali; a Kuwait based entrepreneur trying to live life on his own terms and conditions.
Sanam Chaudhry as Seema; a young divorced girl who dealt with all sort of worldly problems in her early years, these hardships lead her towards spirituality.
Saniya Shamshad as Hania; Seema's younger sister having tiff with Raja Sameer.
Ali Abbas as Peerzada Shahan Ali; Noor Bibi's nephew, on her wish he marries Seema to provide family an heir.
Gohar Rasheed as Raja Sameer Ali; Raja Shaukat's son, having tiff with Seema's family.
Naima Khan as Sultana; Seema, Hania and Ayeza's mother.
Zaib Choudhary as Feroza; Sameer's mother, Shaukat's wife.
Izzah Malik as Ayeza; Seema and Hania's younger sister.
Momina Batool as Saeeda; a girl suggested for marriage with Sameer to provide an heir to Raja family but eventually got married to Shaukat.
Hammad Shoaib as Armaan; Saeeda's past love interest.
Rabi Peerzada as Rabia; Raja Sameer's wife.
Sarah Alie as Roshany; Shahan's wife.
Palwasha Gul as Maheen; Saeeda's younger sister.
Samina Butt as Nasira; a shrewd and greedy women and accomplice to Shaukat.
Rana Aftab as Zafar Choudhary; Shaukat's hooligan friend.
Diya Mughal as Naazia Shehzadi; a girl suggested by Nasira for marriage with Shaukat.
Ali Anjum as Nomi; Sameer's friend.

Production
In early 2018, it was reported that Resham will make small screen appearance in a serial in which she'll portray the character of a spiritual influencer. Sanam Chauhdry and Ali Abbas were also reported to be a part of the serial.

References

External links
 Noor Bibi-Har Pal Geo

Geo TV original programming
2018 Pakistani television series debuts
2019 Pakistani television series endings